The Secession Building is an exhibition hall in Vienna, Austria. It was completed in 1898 by Joseph Maria Olbrich as an architectural manifesto for the Vienna Secession, a group of rebel artists that seceded from the long-established fine art institution.

Description
The building features the Beethoven Frieze by Gustav Klimt, one of the most widely recognized artworks of Secession style (a branch of Art Nouveau, also known as Jugendstil in Germany and Nordic countries). The building was financed by Karl Wittgenstein, the father of Ludwig Wittgenstein.

The motto of the Secessionist movement is written above the entrance of the pavilion: "To every age its art, to every art its freedom". Below this is a sculpture of three gorgons representing painting, sculpture, and architecture.

The building has been selected to figure on the national side of the €0.50 Austrian coin. It also appears as the main motif of one of the Austrian gold collectors' coins: the 100 euro Secession commemorative coin, minted in November 2004, on the obverse side. The reverse depicts a detail from the Beethoven Frieze, which is housed in the building.

Images

Influences 

Young Poland was a modernist period in Polish visual arts, literature and music, covering roughly the years between 1890 and 1918 during Austria-Hungary. Many of the exhibitions were held at the Palace of Art, also known as "Secession", of the Kraków Society of Friends of Fine Arts, in Krakow Old Town.

References

External links 

Art Nouveau collections
Art museums and galleries in Vienna
Buildings and structures in Innere Stadt
Art museums established in 1897
1897 establishments in Austria
Art Nouveau architecture in Vienna
Art Nouveau museum buildings
Cultural infrastructure completed in 1898
19th-century architecture in Austria